Jean-Marie Kretz (born 29 December 1958) is a French weightlifter. He competed in the men's heavyweight I event at the 1984 Summer Olympics.

References

1958 births
Living people
French male weightlifters
Olympic weightlifters of France
Weightlifters at the 1984 Summer Olympics
Place of birth missing (living people)
20th-century French people